The Ten Commandments is the debut studio album by American death metal band Malevolent Creation. It was produced and engineered by Scott Burns.

Track listing

Personnel
 Bret Hoffmann - vocals
 Phil Fasciana - rhythm guitar
 Jeff Juszkiewicz - lead guitar
 Jason Blachowicz - bass
 Mark Simpson - drums

References

Malevolent Creation albums
1991 debut albums
Albums produced by Scott Burns (record producer)
Albums with cover art by Dan Seagrave
Roadrunner Records albums